Club de Fútbol Ballenas Galeana Morelos was a Mexican football club that played in the Tercera División de México. The club was based in  Xochitepec, Morelos.

History
The club was founded in 1956 by Donato Rodríguez who constructed a small field between the streets Hermenegildo Galeana in downtown of Cuernavaca Morelos because the majority of the players lived in that area. That club played in that ground from 1956-1968.

From 1968-2005 the club was under the ownership of Antonio Nava Hernández, the club has participated in various divisions never reaching the top division.

As of 2005 Gregorio Yáñez Pineda, who was a former player in the 1960s, is appointed caretaker and has developed various players that have been able to join other top division clubs. In 2011 the club will be playing in the Segunda División Profesional. In the 2012-2013 season the team won promotion to the Ascenso MX league, Mexico's 2nd tier.

Disappearance of Team
On May 30, 2014, Enrique Bonilla, CEO of Ascenso MX, announced the arrival of Irapuato, instead of Ballenas Galeana, who must relocate due to economic problems, same character that were resolved by guanajuatenses entrepreneurs who in turn asked the team to move to this state. Thus was completed 50 years of history Club Ballenas Galeana Morelos.

Past Crest
The club's crest has always featured a whale since the 1950s.

See also
Football in Mexico

External links
Official Club Page

Football clubs in Morelos
Association football clubs established in 1956
1956 establishments in Mexico